Olga Butkevych (born 3 January 1986) is a Ukrainian-born British wrestler. She is a European Wrestling Championship and World Wrestling Championship bronze medallist. She was Great Britain's sole wrestler at the 2012 Summer Olympics.

Early life
Butkevych was born on 3 January 1986 in Zaporizhia, Ukrainian SSR, Soviet Union.

Career
Butkevych was brought to Britain in 2007 by Nikolei Kornieiev, the Ukrainian-born coach of the British team, to help with training and to act as a sparring partner for British wrestlers. She began competing for Great Britain at wrestling competitions, including the World Championships, where national citizenship is not required. She took third place in the women's  competition at the European Wrestling Championships in April 2011, her first international medal for Great Britain. She placed second in the 2012 Summer Olympics wrestling test event in December 2011.

For Butkevych to compete at the 2012 Games, she needed to gain British citizenship. The sport's governing body petitioned the Home Office in order to ensure that this was received in time for her registration for the Games. She became eligible for British citizenship in February 2012 after living in the UK for five years, and was granted British citizenship and a passport in May 2012.  She had originally been turned down for the citizenship in March 2012, but was awarded it on appeal. This was controversial and led to some newspapers labelling her as a "Plastic Brit". Fellow Ukrainian and British wrestling team member Yana Stadnik had her citizenship application turned down at the same time that Butkevych's was awarded. She was Great Britain's sole wrestler at the 2012 Summer Games, where she competed in the women's  category. Great Britain were originally due to have three wrestling places, but the Olympic Qualification Standards ruled that it should be reduced to a single spot; with Butkevych taking that spot. In the Olympic finals she lost to Lissette Antes of Ecuador and was placed 11th in the final standings.

In September 2012, she became the first British wrestler to medal at the World Championships, when she won a bronze, in Edmonton, Canada.

References

External links
 

British female sport wrestlers
Ukrainian female sport wrestlers
Olympic wrestlers of Great Britain
Wrestlers at the 2012 Summer Olympics
Ukrainian emigrants to the United Kingdom
Sportspeople from Zaporizhzhia
1986 births
Living people
World Wrestling Championships medalists
European Wrestling Championships medalists